Ronald Matthew Mahay (born June 28, 1971) is an American former professional baseball pitcher. He played for the Boston Red Sox, Oakland Athletics, Florida Marlins, Chicago Cubs, Texas Rangers, Atlanta Braves, Kansas City Royals, and Minnesota Twins.  After retiring from active play in January 2013, he was named a scout by the Los Angeles Dodgers for the  season. He is currently the pitching coach for the Mahoning Valley Scrappers of the MLB Draft League.

Professional career

Boston Red Sox
When the 1994–95 Major League Baseball strike lasted into spring training the following year, Mahay was one of the replacement players called up by the Red Sox. As a consequence, Mahay (and all other  replacement players who later made the big leagues) is not eligible for membership in the Major League Baseball Players Association.

Mahay made his Major League debut with the Red Sox on May 21, 1995, as an outfielder, and appeared in five games, batting .200 with four hits in 20 at-bats, including two doubles and a home run. He was returned to the minors after a month. In , Mahay moved from the outfield to the pitching mound where he spent the off-season with the Gold Coast Cougars in the Australian Baseball League perfecting his adaptation to pitcher.

Oakland Athletics
The Oakland Athletics claimed him off the waiver wire, and he appeared in six games for the A's in 1999 and 5 in 2000, including three games as a starter.

Florida Marlins
He was purchased by the Florida Marlins in May  from the Athletics. While pitching for the Marlins, Mahay recorded his last two Major League hits, a single and a double, in four at-bats. He appeared in 18 games with the Marlins, and recorded a 6.04 ERA.

San Diego Padres
He signed with the  San Diego Padres as a free agent in November 2000 but was released on May 15, 2001, after appearing in 14 games with the Portland Beavers in AAA.

Chicago Cubs
Mahay signed with the Chicago Cubs on May 19, 2001, Over the next two seasons he was 2-0 with an 8.59 in 11 appearances with the Cubs.

Texas Rangers
Mahay signed with the Texas Rangers in December 2002, and started the  season with the Triple-A Oklahoma RedHawks. In June of that year, he was called up to Texas, and remained with the big league club almost exclusively until his tenure with the Rangers ended.  was a career year for Mahay, as he notched a career-highs in appearances (60), ERA (2.55) and strikeouts (54).

Atlanta Braves
On July 30, 2007, Mahay was traded along with Mark Teixeira to the Atlanta Braves for Elvis Andrus, Beau Jones, Neftalí Feliz, Matt Harrison and Jarrod Saltalamacchia. In his Braves debut, he tossed a scoreless eighth inning in a 12-3 rout of the Houston Astros. He earned his first win as a Brave on August 11, 2007 against the Philadelphia Phillies. He finished the season 3-0 with a combined 2.55 ERA.

Kansas City Royals
After the 2007 season, Mahay reached an agreement on a two-year, $8 million contract with the Kansas City Royals.

Minnesota Twins
On August 28, 2009 Mahay signed with the  Minnesota Twins as a free agent, after being released by the Royals.

At the end of the 2009 season, Mahay became a free agent. He signed a minor league contract to rejoin the Twins during 2010 spring training. He returned to the majors on April 15, 2010.

Los Angeles Dodgers
On February 3, 2011 he signed a minor league contract with the Los Angeles Dodgers, that included an invite to spring training. He was unable to win a spot on the Dodgers major league roster and was released on March 26.

Arizona Diamondbacks
Mahay signed a minor league contract with the Arizona Diamondbacks on April 8, 2011, but was released on May 13.

St. Louis Cardinals
He signed a minor league contract with the St. Louis Cardinals on July 5, 2011, and was assigned to the Triple-A Memphis Redbirds. He elected to become a free agent on August 12. He made 12 appearances for Memphis, recording a 1.64 ERA and a 1.000 WHIP.

Cincinnati Reds
On January 13, 2012 Mahay signed a Minor League contract with the Reds but was released on May 11 after posting a 4.50 ERA in only 18 innings of work.

On January 27, 2013, Mahay officially announced his retirement from baseball.

Personal
Mahay and his wife, the former Alison Palmieri, were married on November 7, 1998. They have 2 daughters, Madison Parker and Mackenzie Reece, and a son, Mason Patrick.  Mahay now lives in Burbank, California, where he has been an assistant varsity baseball coach at John Burroughs High School.

References

External links

1971 births
Living people
American expatriate baseball players in Canada
Atlanta Braves players
Baseball players from Chicago
Boston Red Sox players
Calgary Cannons players
Chicago Cubs players
Florida Marlins players
Fort Myers Miracle players
Frisco RoughRiders players
Gulf Coast Red Sox players
Iowa Cubs players
Kansas City Royals players
Los Angeles Dodgers scouts
Louisville Bats players
Lynchburg Red Sox players
Major League Baseball pitchers
Major League Baseball replacement players
Memphis Redbirds players
Minnesota Twins players
New Britain Red Sox players
Oakland Athletics players
Oklahoma RedHawks players
Palm Beach Cardinals players
Pawtucket Red Sox players
Portland Beavers players
Reno Aces players
Sarasota Red Sox players
South Suburban Bulldogs baseball players
Sportspeople from Cook County, Illinois
Texas Rangers players
Trenton Thunder players
Vancouver Canadians players
Winter Haven Red Sox players
American expatriate baseball players in Australia